Alnylam Pharmaceuticals, Inc. is an American biopharmaceutical company focused on the discovery, development and commercialization of RNA interference (RNAi) therapeutics for genetically defined diseases. The company was founded in 2002 and is headquartered in Cambridge, Massachusetts. In 2016, Forbes included the company on its "100 Most Innovative Growth Companies" list.

History
The company is a spin-off from the Max Planck Institute for Biophysical Chemistry. In 2002, Alnylam was founded by scientists Phillip Sharp, Paul Schimmel, David Bartel, Thomas Tuschl, and Phillip Zamore, and by investors Christoph Westphal and John Kennedy Clarke; John Maraganore was the founding CEO. The company was named after Alnilam, a star in Orion’s belt. The spelling was modified to make it unique. In 2003, the firm merged with the German pharmaceutical company, Ribopharma AG. The newly formed company also received $24.6 million in funding from private-equity firms. On February 27, 2004, Alnylam Pharmaceuticals filed for an IPO. The company raised $26 million and began trading as ALNY on the Nasdaq stock exchange.

In 2005, the company partnered with Medtronic to develop drug-device combinations to treat neurodegenerative disorders, and in 2006 with  Biogen Idec to develop treatments of progressive multifocal leukoencephalopathy. In 2007, it  entered into a nonexclusive alliance with Hoffmann-La Roche, in which Alnylam received $331 million in exchange for access to its technology platform. and also partnered with Ionis Pharmaceuticals to found the company Regulus Therapeutics, focused on microRNA therapeutics.

In 2009, the company formed alliances with Cubist Pharmaceuticals and Kyowa Hakko Kirin to market a drug targeted at respiratory syncytial virus. In 2010, it expanded its previous collaboration with Medtronic to include the CHDI Foundation in its Huntington's disease focused research. In 2011, it partnered with GlaxoSmithKline to develop RNAi technology enhancing vaccine production. The company entered into a 10-year alliance with Monsanto in 2012, to develop biotech solutions for the farming industry by developing natural molecules for crop protection. In 2012, it formed a partnership with Sanofi Genzyme to develop a treatment for transthyretin-mediated amyloidosis, a hereditary disease in Asia. In February 2013, it formed a partnership with The Medicines Company to develop a drug to treat a genetic form of high cholesterol.

In July 2013, during a Phase I trial Alnylam demonstrated statistically significant reduction of a protein called transthyretin, or TTR and demonstrated human efficacy with intravenous and subcutaneous modes of administration. In 2014, Sanofi Genzyme acquired a 12 percent stake in Alnylam and increased its rights to several of the company's drugs for $700 million. In a separate transaction Alnylam announced that it had purchased Merck & Co.'s Sirna Therapeutics, for $25 million cash and $150 million in stock. In 2015, the company had $41 million in revenue and a market cap of $5.2 billion.

In 2016, the company purchased land in Norton, Massachusetts to build a manufacturing facility.

In October 2016 the Phase III clinical trial of the company's lead product, revusiran, was halted due to increased deaths in the drug arm of the trial, and the company said it was terminating development of the compound.

In February 2020, Alnylam appointed former Sanofi CEO Olivier Brandicourt to its board of directors. In 2021, it was announced that Maraganore would step down as CEO, to be succeeded by the company's chief operating officer, Yvonne Greenstreet, on January 1, 2022.

In December 2021, Alnylam submitted a clinical trial authorisation (CTA) application to the Medicines and Healthcare Products Regulatory Agency in the United Kingdom to initiate a Phase 1 study of ALN-APP, an investigational RNAi therapeutic targeting amyloid precursor protein (APP) for the treatment of Alzheimer’s disease and cerebral amyloid angiopathy.

On December 22, 2021, Novartis announced that the US Food and Drug Administration (FDA) approved Leqvio (inclisiran), a small interfering RNA (siRNA) therapy to lower low-density lipoprotein cholesterol. Leqvio is indicated in the United States as an adjunct to diet and maximally tolerated statin therapy for the treatment of adults with clinical atherosclerotic cardiovascular disease (ASCVD) or heterozygous familial hypercholesterolemia (HeFH) who require additional lowering of LDL-C. The effect of Leqvio on cardiovascular morbidity and mortality is being explored in clinical trials currently underway. Novartis obtained global rights to develop, manufacture and commercialize Leqvio under a license and collaboration agreement with Alnylam Pharmaceuticals.

Alnylam still does not earn money, but writes losses. The losses ("GAAP Operating Loss") from Alnylam were around $650 million in the late 2020. Alnylam expects to achieve net profits financially in 2022 or 2023.

Products
In 2016, Alnylam Pharmaceuticals had 18 potential treatments in various development stages in genetic medicine, cardiometabolic disease and hepatic infectious disease. 

In late 2016, the company's lead candidate in phase III studies was patisiran, a treatment targeting transthyretin (TTR) for the treatment of TTR-mediated amyloidosis (ATTR), in patients with the compromised nervous system condition of familial amyloidotic polyneuropathy (FAP).
In August 2018, with its commercial name Onpattro, patisiran received the U.S. regulatory approval to treat polyneuropathy in patients with hereditary ATTR amyloidosis.

References

External links

 Alnylam on ClinicalTrials.gov

Pharmaceutical companies of the United States
Biotechnology companies of the United States
Biopharmaceutical companies
Companies listed on the Nasdaq
Therapeutic gene modulation
Health care companies based in Massachusetts
Companies based in Cambridge, Massachusetts
Biotechnology companies established in 2002
Pharmaceutical companies established in 2002
2002 establishments in Massachusetts
2004 initial public offerings